Tara Magalski is an American actress, television personality, and a holistic health coach. She is the founder of Divine Lifestyles, IPA International and Healing is Hot TV. Magalski attended American International University (AIU) in London and graduated with a degree in Communications.

Career
After graduating from college, Magalski became a casting assistant and production coordinator for various TV shows on ABC and CBS. She worked for King World Productions before going back to school and received a Master's degree in Acting at The Maggie Flanigan Studio affiliated with Rutgers University. She has appeared in various commercials, films, and  TV guest appearances.

Tara Magalski is a certified holistic health coach (HHC) specializing in emotional eating and  "spiritual" food, lifestyle entrepreneur, motivational speaker, author, TV host, and philanthropist.

Magalski set up Divine Lifestyles, a weekly podcast, and Healing is Hot (Healthy on-Going Transformation) TV. She has been featured on FOX 5 LIVE, as a health expert, Fabulous Female Network, Harboring Hearts, Heels & Helmets, and Freedom Fast Lane. She is a graduate of the Institute of Integrative Nutrition, the world's largest nutrition school, which is affiliated with Columbia University and The State University of New York. She is also a board-certified and accredited member of the American Association of Drugless Practitioners.

Magalski is involved in several charities and sits on a variety of boards that primarily focus on the advancement of women. She is a Program Developer for Girls Health Ed, which seeks to educate girls aged between 8-17 about nutrition, body image, physical fitness, personal care and reproductive health.

Filmography
Magalski has appeared in The Unknown (2008),
Shut Up and Sing (2006),
The Wedding Weekend (2006),
Hardrock (2007),
The Stick Up Kids (2008),
The Lonely Cure, and
The Murder Plans (2011).

References

External links
 Personal webpage of Tara Magalski

Living people
American motivational writers
Women motivational writers
American motivational speakers
Life coaches
American businesspeople
Year of birth missing (living people)
People from New York (state)